The Toronto Marlborough Athletic Club, commonly known as the Toronto Marlboros, was an ice hockey franchise in Toronto, Canada. Founded in 1903, it operated junior ice hockey and senior ice hockey teams in the Ontario Hockey Association and later the Ontario Hockey League. The Marlboros were a farm team to the Toronto Maple Leafs and one of the dominant junior teams in history, winning seven Memorial Cup championships. The senior team competed for the Stanley Cup in 1904, and won the Allan Cup in 1950. After decline from the late 1970s, the sale of the franchise, and a move away from Toronto, it became the Guelph Storm 1991.

Their heritage has been perpetuated by the Toronto Marlboros Hockey Club, which operates several minor ice hockey teams in the Greater Toronto Hockey League; and the Toronto Marlies of the American Hockey League.

History
The Toronto Marlborough Athletic Club was founded in Toronto, Ontario in 1903 by a group of Toronto sportsmen. It was named after the Duke of Marlborough. A hockey program was started in 1904. The team was commonly known as the Marlboros or Marlies and was also nicknamed the Dukes.

The senior ice hockey team played in the Ontario Hockey Association and won the J. Ross Robertson Cup in 1904, 1905, 1941, 1949 and 1950. 

The senior team competed for, but lost, the Stanley Cup in 1904 against the Ottawa Silver Seven.  The club was thrust onto the national scene in 1927 when Conn Smythe bought the Toronto Marlboros to be the farm team for his other recently acquired National Hockey League team, the Toronto Maple Leafs.  From 1927 to 1989 the Marlboros and Maple Leafs shared common ownership, first under the Smythe family and later under Harold Ballard. Upon the death of Conn Smythe, his son Stafford Smythe inherited the teams, and later sold a portion of both clubs to Harold Ballard. Ballard became sole owner of both teams upon the passing of Stafford Smythe.

In 1933, Frank J. Selke testified in court that the Marlboros senior team had a proposed agreement to guarantee its finances by the Toronto Maple Leafs. The agreement went unsigned when OHA secretary W. A. Hewitt voiced opposition to the financial support of amateur teams by professional teams.

The Marlboros served as a farm team for the Maple Leafs for 40 years until direct NHL sponsorship of junior teams ended in 1967 when the NHL made the Entry Draft universal; however, the two clubs continued to remain affiliated under a common ownership until 1989. During this time the Marlboros sent over 180 players to the NHL, including six future Hockey Hall of Fame inductees. The two teams often played double headers on Saturdays, with the junior games in the afternoon and the NHL games in the evening.

The original Hot Stove Club was formed at Maple Leaf Gardens on May 28, 1937, for the purpose of raising funds to support the Marlborough Hockey Club. The Hot Stove Club was given a permanent bar & lounge at Maple Leaf Gardens in 1963. From 1929 to 1975 the Marlboros won the national junior championship seven times.

Marlboro players from the Memorial Cups in the 1950s and 1960s jumped directly to the Maple Leafs, helping them win the Stanley Cup four times in the 1960s. Former NHL stars stayed in the organization to help coach in the junior ranks. Turk Broda and George Armstrong both coached the Marlboros to Memorial Cup victories.

Stafford Smythe organized the Metro Junior A League in 1961 as a rival league to the OHA, with the Marlboros as its charter member. After the league folded in 1963, the Toronto Neil McNeil Maroons were amalgamated into the Marlboros along with prospect players signed to the Toronto Maple Leafs, along with their coach Jim Gregory.

The Marlboros returned to prominence again in 1973, coached by former Toronto Maple Leafs captain George Armstrong. Armstrong's team in 1973 lost only seven games all season, and two years later he coached the Marlboros to their seventh national title in 1975.

The team began to decline in the standings in the late 1970s which continued through the 1980s. Many people felt that Harold Ballard's penny-pinching ways helped contribute to the demise of Canada's most successful junior team. In October 1988, with the team losing hundreds of thousands of dollars a year, Maple Leaf Gardens Limited reached an agreement to sell the Toronto Marlboros for a reported $500,000, severing their ties with the Maple Leafs. The Leafs retained the rights to the Marlies name.  The OHL team moved to Hamilton for the 1989-90 season, becoming the Dukes of Hamilton. They were not financially successful in Hamilton, though, and after only two seasons the Dukes became the Guelph Storm.

Championships
The Toronto Marlboros won the Memorial Cup seven times, more than any other team in the Cup's history. The Marlies also won 10 OHA championships in 18 final appearances.

J. Ross Robertson Cup
1928 Won vs. Newmarket Redmen
1929 Won vs. Kitchener Greenshirts
1932 Won vs. Newmarket Redmen
1940 Lost to Oshawa Generals
1941 Lost to Oshawa Generals
1949 Lost to Barrie Flyers
1951 Lost to Barrie Flyers
1954 Lost to St. Catharines Teepees
1955 Won vs. St. Catharines Teepees
1956 Won vs. Barrie Flyers
1958 Won vs. Hamilton Tiger Cubs
1964 Won vs. Montreal Jr. Canadiens 
1965 Lost to Niagara Falls Flyers
1967 Won vs. Hamilton Red Wings
1970 Lost to Montreal Jr. Canadiens
1971 Lost to St. Catharines Black Hawks
1973 Won vs. Peterborough Petes
1975 Won vs. Hamilton Fincups

Hamilton Spectator Trophy
1959–1960  59 points
1963–1964  87 points
1971–1972  93 points
1972–1973 103 points
1974–1975 105 points

Memorial Cup
1929 Defeated Elmwood Millionaires
1955 Defeated Regina Pats
1956 Defeated Regina Pats
1964 Defeated Edmonton Oil Kings
1967 Defeated Port Arthur Marrs
1973 Defeated Quebec Remparts
1975 Defeated New Westminster Bruins

Eastern Canadian Champions
1928 Lost to Ottawa Gunners
1929 Defeated Ottawa Shamrocks

George Richardson Memorial Trophy
1955 Defeated Quebec Frontenacs
1956 Defeated Montreal Jr. Canadiens
1958 Lost to Ottawa-Hull Junior Canadiens
1964 Defeated Notre Dame de Grace Monarchs
1967 Defeated Thetford Mines Canadiens

Memorial Cups

1929 
The Marlboros reached their first Memorial Cup series in 1929 after being upset in 1928 by the Ottawa Gunners. In 1929 the Marlboros defeated the Ottawa Shamrocks in a two-game total goals series by 6–5. Ottawa won the first game 4–3, and Toronto won the second game 3–1.

Toronto played the Elmwood Millionaires from Winnipeg, Manitoba, in a best of three series starting on March 29 at the Arena Gardens (Mutual Street Arena) for the Memorial Cup. The Marlboros won the first game 4–2 in overtime. On March 31, Toronto won game 2 by an identical score of 4–2 for its first Memorial Cup.

1955
Turk Broda took over the coaching duties of the Marlboros midway through the 1954–55 season. In the playoffs the Marlboros defeated the reigning Memorial Cup champions St. Catharines Teepees, followed by the Quebec Remparts to win the Eastern Canadian championship.

After a long train ride to Regina, Saskatchewan, to Marlboros and the Regina Pats took part in the First Annual Memorial Cup Dinner. The idea of the banquet was one of Harold Ballard's many long-lasting effects on the game. The next day the two teams would start a best of seven series for the Cup.

Regina won the first game 3–1. Toronto won the next two games scores of 5–2, and 3–2. Regina tied up game four at 2 goals each in the dying minutes of regulation to send the match to overtime. Billy Harris scored in overtime to give the Marlboros a 3 games to 1 lead. Game five was also tied after three periods. Toronto scored three unanswered goals, winning 8–5 in overtime, and their second Memorial Cup.

1956
Toronto defeated the Montreal Junior Canadiens in an 8-game series to return to the Memorial Cup and a rematch versus the Regina Pats.
The championship series started at Maple Leaf Gardens on April 27.

The teams tied the first game at 4 goals each. Toronto put together three consecutive victories by scores of 5–1, 4–2, and 6–1.
The Marlboros captured their second consecutive Memorial Cup in game five by a score of 7–4. The Oshawa Generals were the first team to accomplish the feat in 1938–39 and 1939–40.

1964
Toronto defeated the defending OHA champions Niagara Falls Flyers and the Montreal Jr. Canadiens to win the J. Ross Robertson Cup. The Marlboros swept the NOHA champion North Bay Trappers to play the Quebec champion Notre-Dame-de-Grace Monarchs, who were coached by Scotty Bowman. Toronto prevailed to return to the Memorial Cup after an eight-year absence. Their opponent was the perennial Abbott Cup champion Edmonton Oil Kings.

The series opened at Maple Leaf Gardens with a 5–2 Toronto victory. The Marlboros won games two and three with scores of 3–2 and 5–2. Toronto finished the series sweep with a 7–2 win in game 4. Many of the players on the 1964 Marlboros team, including Ron Ellis, Mike Walton and Pete Stemkowski, helped the Maple Leafs capture the Stanley Cup in 1967.

1967
Toronto defeated the Montreal Jr. Canadiens and Hamilton Red Wings for the OHA title, then eliminated the Thetford Mines Canadiens to capture the eastern Canadian championships. The Marlboros played the Port Arthur Marrs in the Memorial Cup series hosted at the Fort William Gardens in what is now the city of Thunder Bay, Ontario.

The Marlboros won the first two games by scores of 6–3, and 8–4. Port Arthur won the third game 6–4 in a heavily penalized match, including a bench brawl with one second left in the game. Toronto won the last two games by scores of 6–0, and 6–3 capturing its 5th Memorial Cup. In 1966–67, the Maple Leafs also won the Stanley Cup, the last year the two clubs were national champions at the same time.

1973
The Marlboros of 1972–73 lost only seven games in the regular season. The team was ranked # 1 in Canada going into the playoffs. Toronto eliminated the St. Catharines Black Hawks and Ottawa 67's before meeting the Peterborough Petes in the OHA finals.

The series versus the Petes went to a seventh game played at Maple Leaf Gardens in front of 16,485 spectators, a record at the time for junior hockey attendance. Toronto needed only a tie game to advance, and did so in dramatic fashion. Paulin Bordeleau scored on a penalty shot in the last minute to tie the game at 5 goals each.

After winning the OHA title, the Marlboros travelled to Memorial Cup hosted at the Montreal Forum where their opponents would be the Quebec Remparts and the Medicine Hat Tigers, who were led by future NHL star Lanny McDonald.

The Marlies beat Quebec 5–2 in the first game, and lost 3–2 to the Tigers in the second game. The Remparts then beat the Tigers 8–3 in game three. Since each team had won a game, Toronto and Quebec played each other in the finals based on goals for and against. The Marlboros scored a 9–1 victory for their 6th Memorial Cup.

1975
The 1975 playoff run for the Marlboros was complicated by Mark Napier and John Tonelli signing professional contracts before the season ended. Tonelli would sit out all the Marlboros games after his 18th birthday so he would not jeopardize playing for the Houston Aeros.

Toronto stumbled through the playoffs managing come-from-behind victories in series versus the 8th place Kingston Canadians and 5th place Sudbury Wolves. Both series went 8 games, and the Marlboros were a point away from being eliminated each time but stayed alive. The Marlboros then beat the Hamilton Fincups in the finals for their last OHA championship. Toronto would face the New Westminster Bruins, and the Sherbrooke Castors in the Memorial Cup series played at the Kitchener Memorial Auditorium Complex.

Toronto beat Sherbrooke 5–4 in overtime in game 1 after coming back from three goals down. The Bruins beat the Castors (Beavers in English) 7–5 in game two, defeated Toronto 6–2 in the third game to reach the finals. In a rematch versus the Castors in the semi-final, Toronto won 10–4 to reach the finals versus New Westminster.

The Marlboros continued their momentum in the finals winning 7–3, and capturing their seventh and final Memorial Cup championship. Coach Armstrong said it was all worth it, even after his team had tossed him into the hotel swimming pool during a victory party.

Coaches
One of the most famous Maple Leafs and Marlboros of all time, George Armstrong, coached the Marlboros to their final two Memorial Cup victories in 1972–73 and 1974–75.

Two Toronto Marlboros coaches have been awarded the Matt Leyden Trophy as the OHA Coach of the Year: George Armstrong 1972–73 in his first year, and Dave Chambers in 1979–80.

Partial list of Toronto Marlboros coaches.

Players
Until the NHL instituted the Entry Draft in 1967, the Maple Leafs relied heavily on the Jr. A. Marlboros to produce NHL players. Many players were part of Maple Leafs Stanley Cup winning teams. In total, 202 OHA Junior Marlboros went on to play in the National Hockey League.

Award winners

Red Tilson Trophy(Most Outstanding Player)
1949–50 - George Armstrong
1971-72 - Dave Gardner

Eddie Powers Memorial Trophy(Scoring Champion)
1937–38 - Hank Goldup
1940–41 - Gaye Stewart
1971–72 - Billy Harris & Dave Gardner
1974–75 - Bruce Boudreau

Jim Mahon Memorial Trophy(Top Scoring Right Winger)
1971–72 - Billy Harris
1974–75 - Mark Napier

Emms Family Award(Rookie of the Year)
1979–80 - Bruce Dowie

Dave Pinkney Trophy(Lowest Team GAA)
1949–50 - Don Lockhart
1950–51 - Don Lockhart
1951–52 - Don Head
1952–53 - John Henderson
1954–55 - John Albani
1955–56 - Jim Crocket
1956–57 - Len Broderick
1957–58 - Len Broderick
1972–73 - Mike Palmateer

Leo Lalonde Memorial Trophy(Overage Player of the Year)
1986–87 - Mike Richard

Bobby Smith Trophy(Scholastic Player of the Year)
1988–89 - Brian Collinson

Hockey Hall of Famers
Six players who played for the Marlboros and Maple Leafs have been inducted into the Hockey Hall of Fame. They are George Armstrong, Charlie Conacher, Red Horner, Harvey Jackson, Joe Primeau and Bob Pulford. Former Marlboros Brad Park and Mark Howe were also inducted into the Hall of Fame as  NHL defenceman, and Carl Voss was inducted as a builder.

NHL alumni

Other alumni

 G Bob Perani - played for OHA Jr and OHA Sr teams
 D Doug Dunville - 1964-65, 1965–66

Season results

Results prior to 1937 are currently unavailable.

Legend: GP = Games played, W = Wins, L = Losses, T = Ties, Pts = Points, GF = Goals for, GA = Goals against

Notes

Uniforms and logos
In 1903 club secretary Fred Waghorne wrote to the Duke of Marlborough in England for permission to use the storied name and crest. In choosing its logo the club took the Marlborough family crown and added the initials A.C. for Athletic Club.

The Toronto Marlboros used the same colour scheme as the NHL Toronto Maple Leafs from 1927 when the two club came under common ownership. The Marlborough crown was originally displayed by itself on the jersey chest. It was not until the late 1950s that the crown was set against the present day Maple Leaf.

Arenas
In the beginning both the Toronto Maple Leafs and the Marlboros practised and were headquartered out of the old Ravina Gardens in Toronto's west end. Home games were played downtown at the Arena Gardens.

In 1931 Maple Leaf Gardens opened up for business and the Marlboros had a new home again. In 1964 the Marlboros won the Memorial Cup on home ice, the same year the Toronto Maple Leafs won the Stanley Cup on home ice.

The Marlboros occasionally also played games in the 1970s at the North York Centennial Centre and the Markham Centennial Centre when Maple Leaf Gardens was unavailable, usually due to scheduling conflicts at MLG with both the Toronto Maple Leafs and also the Toronto Toros of the WHA. They also played part of their home schedule in the 1976–77 season in Brantford, Ontario out of the Brantford Civic Centre.

Perpetuations

Minor hockey
The Toronto Marlboros Hockey Club operates several minor ice hockey teams in the Greater Toronto Hockey League (GTHL). This club operated independently to the former OHA Junior 'A' team. After the Junior 'A' team left for Hamilton, the then Maple Leafs owner Harold Ballard granted permission for the Minor Marlboros to retain the Marlborough name. Three years later in the fall of 1992 the Marlboros combined their fabled crest with the current NHL Maple Leafs' uniform.

NHL alumni of the GTHL Marlboros include, Sam Gagner, Ron Handy, Mike Hough, Peter Ing, Chris Kelly, Nathan LaFayette, Connor McDavid, Rick Nash, Mike Ricci, Jason Spezza, Brian Wilks, Wojtek Wolski and John Tavares.

American Hockey League
When Maple Leaf Sports & Entertainment decided to relocate their American Hockey League minor league team, the St. John's Maple Leafs to Toronto, they renamed the team the Toronto Marlies after the original Toronto Marlboros club.

References

External links
 Marlies History
Minor Marlboros official web site
Toronto Marlies official web site

 
Defunct Ontario Hockey League teams
Ma
Ice hockey clubs established in 1903
Maple Leaf Sports & Entertainment
Toronto Maple Leafs minor league affiliates
1903 establishments in Ontario
Sports clubs disestablished in 1989
1989 disestablishments in Ontario